Frederick W. Dawes (2 May 1911 – 12 August 1989) was an English professional footballer who played in the Football League as a defender for Northampton Town and Crystal Palace. He also managed Crystal Palace and was the younger brother of Albert Dawes, who also played professionally for Crystal Palace and Northampton.

Playing career
Dawes began his youth career with Aldershot and, in 1929, signed for Northampton Town, where his older brother Albert was also a player. Between then and 1936, Dawes made 162 League appearances for the club, scoring once.

In February 1936, Dawes signed for Crystal Palace, once again re-joining his older brother who had moved to Palace in 1933, and immediately established himself in the side being ever-present for the remainder of that season and throughout the 1936–37 season. Dawes went on to make a total of 223 Football League appearances for Palace before being forced to retire as a player, through injury, during the 1949–50 season. Dawes career was notable in that he completed a century of appearances for Crystal Palace either side of World War II.

Managerial career
After retiring as a player, Dawes was appointed as assistant to then Crystal Palace manager Ronnie Rooke. Despite a reasonably successful 1949–50 season and a number of close-season signings, the club had a very poor start to the 1950–51 season. In November 1950, Rooke was relieved of his position and Dawes was appointed as joint-manager, together with chief scout Charlie Slade. However, the partnership was unable to improve upon the season start and the club had to seek re-election in 1951. The 1951–52 season also began poorly and Dawes and Slade were dismissed in October.

Later career
Dawes was reinstated as an amateur by the Football Association after leaving Crystal Palace and went on to play for Beckenham Town. After leaving football altogether, Dawes became a shopkeeper.

Fred Dawes died on 12 August 1989 in Shirley, Surrey, aged 78.

References

External links
 
 Fred Dawes at holmesdale.net

1911 births
1989 deaths
English footballers
Association football defenders
English Football League players
Aldershot F.C. players
Northampton Town F.C. players
Crystal Palace F.C. players
Beckenham Town F.C. players
Crystal Palace F.C. managers
Brentford F.C. wartime guest players
English football managers